Bruno Loscos (born 28 April 1975) is a French short track speed skater. He competed at the 1994 Winter Olympics, the 1998 Winter Olympics and the 2002 Winter Olympics.

References

1975 births
Living people
French male short track speed skaters
Olympic short track speed skaters of France
Short track speed skaters at the 1994 Winter Olympics
Short track speed skaters at the 1998 Winter Olympics
Short track speed skaters at the 2002 Winter Olympics
Sportspeople from Lyon
20th-century French people
21st-century French people